Clyde Township is a civil township of St. Clair County in the U.S. state of Michigan. The population was 5,579 at the 2010 Census.

The township is named for the River Clyde in Scotland. In 1825, a Scotsman Robert Smart, with the backing of Detroit interests, built a mill on the Black River. Smart named the place "Clyde Mills", after the river in where he had lived as a boy. Clyde Township was organized in March 1836 and took its name from the settlement. When first organized, Clyde Township encompassed the area of what are now 20 townships. When Kimball Township was set off in 1855, the settlement by which Clyde Township derived its name became part of a different township. The settlement in Kimball Township is now known as Wadhams.

Communities 
The Township has a number of unincorporated communities: 
Abbottsford on the western boundary with Kenockee Township.
It was first settled by Allen Atkins in 1837 and William Atkins in 1839. It was a station on the Pere Marquette Railway. A post office operated from April 1873 until June 1935.
It was a station on the Pere Marquette Railway, so named because it was located on North street on the section that is currently a part of M-136. A post office operated from April 1879 until May 1879 and was restored in June 1884. The North Street ZIP code, 48049, serves almost all of Clyde Township as well as a small portion of Port Huron Township south of the Black River. "Clyde, Michigan" and "Ruby, Michigan" are also acceptable city names for the 48049 ZIP code.
 Ruby is in the west central part of the township at Brott and Abbottsford Roads . A post office operated from September 1854 until January 1907.

Geography

Demographics

As of the census of 2000, there were 5,523 people, 1,931 households, and 1,591 families residing in the township. The racial makeup of the township was 97.74% White, 0.29% African American, 0.34% Native American, 0.38% Asian, 0.04% Pacific Islander, 0.34% from other races, and 0.87% from two or more races. Hispanic or Latino of any race were 1.27% of the population.

There were 1,931 households, out of which 37.2% had children under the age of 18 living with them, 72.9% were married couples living together, 6.0% had a female householder with no husband present, and 17.6% were non-families. 13.3% of all households were made up of individuals, and 4.6% had someone living alone who was 65 years of age or older.  The average household size was 2.85 and the average family size was 3.11.

In the township the population was spread out, with 26.5% under the age of 18, 7.4% from 18 to 24, 28.8% from 25 to 44, 28.1% from 45 to 64, and 9.1% who were 65 years of age or older.  The median age was 38 years. For every 100 females, there were 102.5 males.  For every 100 females age 18 and over, there were 100.6 males.

The median income for a household in the township was $53,986, and the median income for a family was $60,565. Males had a median income of $43,179 versus $27,026 for females. The per capita income for the township was $22,882.  About 4.3% of families and 4.9% of the population were below the poverty line, including 5.7% of those under age 18 and 4.6% of those age 65 or over.

References

External links
Clyde Township official web site

Townships in St. Clair County, Michigan
Townships in Michigan